First Recordings 1973 is an album by John Zorn featuring recordings that he made while still a student between 1973 and 1974 which was released on the Tzadik label in 1995.

Reception

The AllMusic review by Stacia Proefrock noted: "Zorn calls this collection "the craziest stuff I've ever done" and he could be right, with the possible exception of the Painkiller albums, which are perhaps just louder rather than crazier. That said, this work is, predictably, not Zorn's best, but it holds value for fans as an embryonic example of his innovation and style". 

The Penguin Guide to Jazz observed: "The debut recordings see him navigating a solitary course through the shattered columns of avant-garde jazz... suggests where Zorn was artistically at the age of nineteen... [and] offer useful pointers to the years ahead and their obsessions".

Track listing
 "Mikhail Zoetrope" (1974): Act I - 22:13
 "Mikhail Zoetrope" (1974): Act II - 13:30
 "Mikhail Zoetrope" (1974): Act III - 11:00
 "Conquest of Mexico" (1973): Part 1 Warning Signs - 7:45
 "Conquest of Mexico (1973): Part 2 Confession - 3:39
 "Conquest of Mexico" (1973): Part 3 Convulsions/Abdication - 3:56
 "Wind Ko/La" (1973) - 3:04
 "Automata of Al-Jazari" (1974) - 1:16
 "Variations on a Theme by Albert Ayler" (1973) - 11:14

Personnel
John Zorn – all instruments and sounds

References

John Zorn albums
Tzadik Records albums
1995 albums
Albums produced by John Zorn
Sound collage albums